El-Mina or El Mina (Arabic: الميناء / ALA-LC: al-Mīnā’, which means "the harbour"), is a coastal independent town that neighbors Tripoli, Northern Lebanon. El-Mina occupies the location of the old Phoenician city of Tripolis. It acts as the harbor city for the neighboring Tripoli, Lebanon's second-largest city, situated 5 km to the east. 

El-Mina has a municipality on its own. The Port of Tripoli falls within El Mina jurisdiction, but is operated jointly by the municipalities of El-Mina and Tripoli.

History
El-Mina is the site of the ancient city of Tripolis that dates back to the Phoenician era, and is one of Lebanon's oldest cities, alongside Byblos, Tyre, and Sidon. 
The site of Tripolis moved inland after the Islamic reconquest from the crusaders, and today's El-Mina became the harbour district of greater Tripoli, eventually having its own municipal board in the beginning of the 20th century, separate from that of Tripoli, but within the context of greater Tripoli. It was called also Tripoli Marina.

Geography
El-Mina is the city with the largest number of islands surrounding it, along the Levantine coastline. It has nine islands, the closest, the Abdul Wahab Island, can be visited by crossing a bridge over the sea. The farthest island, Ramkin, is 10 km away from the coast, and has a lighthouse. Four of the islands have been declared as natural reservations, to help breed fish, and preserve their natural habitat.
The city's seashore extends 3 to 4 km, and its famous seashore sidewalk, the "corniche", is a popular site frequented by people from all around Lebanon, who come to enjoy the fresh air.  
The city is mostly flat, and has a diameter of only 1 km, that extends from the seashore to the border of the city of Tripoli. Due to large expansion, El-Mina and Tripoli are almost attached.

Islands

Al-Bakkar ("the cowman") island: Commonly known as Abdul Wahab Island, it is the closest island to the coastline, and can be reached by crossing a bridge.
Al-Nakhl ("the palm trees") Island or commonly known as Al-Aranib ("The Rabbits") Island is the largest island and is declared Palm Islands Nature Reserve.
Al-Billan (named after a type of plant that grows on it) contains a small cavern on the west side.
Al-Ramkin also known as Al-Fanar: El-Mina's farthest island, and has a lighthouse. The island was frequented by slain Prime Minister Rashid Karami, who sought refuge at the island for moments of peace and quiet.
Sanani is also a natural reserve where sea turtles lay their eggs.
Al-Rmayleh is one of the smaller islands. Its name is derived from the existence of a small sand beach on it.
Al-`Ashaak ("the lovers") is also known as El-Tenieh ("the second").
Al-Telteh ("the third") is a flat, rocky island midway between the coastline and the farthest island, Al-Ramkin.
Al-Rab`aa ("the fourth"), also known as Al-Maatih ("the cut-off"), is the smallest island and is used as a docking place by fishermen while out at sea.

City Parks

Mashti (The Winter) is close to the seaside where the old port of the city used to be. A large anchor is placed at the center of the park.
Shouhada (Martyrs) was constructed in 1964 and has a water fountain at its center.
Baher (Fabulous) contains more than 500 types of trees.
El-Bi'a (The Environment) contains some monumental remains, palm trees, and flowering shrubs.

Demographics
El-Mina (just like neighboring Tripoli) has a majority of Sunni Muslims. Lebanon's small Alawite community and Christian community each constitute today less than 5 percent of the population of the city.

City towers

El-Mina traditionally was a walled city, with five outpost towers to protect the city from external invasion.

The Lion Tower (Borj Al-Sbaa`) is the only tower still standing today.
Arabay was partially demolished, and a new building resembling a castle was built on top of its ruins.
Al-Dewan was built by prince Terseddine Aytamash al-Jarkassly during the Ottoman rule (demolished).
Sheikh-Affan is where two of El-Mina's oldest houses stand today.
Ezzeddine was built by prince Sefeddine Jalaban in 1442,  rubble of which still remains.

Food and fish
El-Mina Is also known and popular with the fish market and  restaurants, where one can go to the many fish markets and choose the fresh fish coming directly from the fishermen. In the city are popular fish restaurants where one can take lunch or dinner in a superb location opposite to the sea while eating the famous and delicious fish and sea food.

Landmarks

The Lion Tower is the only remaining tower of the five protective towers built around the city during the Mamlouk period to protect the city from foreign invasions.
The Corniche is the city's most visited site, with a long sidewalk along the coast of the city, around 4.5 km long, where people come for a walk or sports and leisure activities such as fishing and sailing. A large number of cafes along the corniche makes it an attractive site for tourists and locals alike.
Khan Al-Tamasili is an old Ottoman-style building that was an old marketplace during the Ottoman era.
The Railway station Tripoli railway station is located in El-Mina, It formed the terminus of the Orient Express line in the twenties, thirties and forties of the last century.

Economics

El-Mina is mainly a service-oriented city; much like most of Lebanon, the services sector is the main source of economic income of the city, and employs the largest number of people. Restaurants and cafes are abundant along the city streets, serving tourists and locals alike, who frequent the "Corniche" during afternoons and weekends. The second-most important sector of the city's economy is the fishing industry. As a consequence to the exposure of the city to the sea, the inhabitants have been fishermen and seamen by trade for centuries. This industry employs the second-largest number of citizens of El-Mina, and contributes considerably to the city economy.

The city has a small harbor for fishing boats that hosts a considerable number of small fishing boats. The city's fish market is well known by Lebanese from all over the country. Albeit, the fishermen failed to modernize and incorporate the industry into a well established and strong source of economic wealth, and the combined output of the fishermen fails to supply even the local community, often forcing fish traders to import frozen fish from Turkey. In addition, the lack of heavy equipment and deep-sea fishing ships has left this sector decades behind.

Politics

Because of its location on the Mediterranean coast and its history as a trading hub, similar to metropolitan coastal cities such as Beirut, El-Mina is characterized by its diversity and rich political culture, as most Lebanese political parties hold offices in the city. El Mina citizens, like most Lebanese citizens, are politically aware. The Mayoral elections are always a fierce and closely contested race.

The Municipality of El-Mina is independent from Tripoli and it was established by the Ottomans in 1882 with the Mayor being appointed by the Ottoman district governor and was held chronologically by:

 Ibrahim Alamedine (1882- by appointment)
 Mouheiddine Kabbara (by appointment)
 Rami Basha ( 1984 - by appointment)
 Mouheiddine Yafi (by appointment)

After the First World War, and the French colonization of Lebanon, mayoral position remained by appointment by the French district governor.
Nour Alamedine (1920–1928)
Moustafa Ghazi (1928–1933)

The French mandate introduced the municipal committee that would later become the city council.

Abdel Satar Alamedine (1933–1935)
Kheireddine Abdul Wahab (1933–1944)

The posts remained vacant between 1944-1947 after the independence of Lebanon, and the first elections were held in 1947.

Mounir Alamoun (1947–1951)
Saadi Ghazi (1951–1955)
Habib Abdul Wahab (1955–1959)
Saiid Bayeklee (1960–1964)
Ahmed Ghazi (1964–1968)
Ahmed Moumtaz Kabara (1968–1972)
Abdel Kader Alamedine (1972-1998)

With the eruption of the Lebanon Civil War in 1975, mayoral elections were no longer held till 1998, and Alamedine remained in office till then. Many regard Alamedine to be the builder of modern El Mina, notably the construction of the El Mina Corniche, which has become an integral part of the city's attractions and landmarks.

After the war, and the municipality became of 21 members (14 Muslims and 7 Christians by an oral agreement, the Mayor is a Sunni and his deputy is a Christian. In the first election in 1998, Alamedine was re-elected into office,

Abdelkader Alamedine (1998–2001, resigned)
Mouhamad Helou (2001–2004)
Abdelkader Alamedine (2004–2010)
Mohammad Issa (2010–2012)
Vacant (2012–2016)
AbdelKader Alamedine (2016–Present)

In 2012, seven members of the city municipality council, that makes third of the council, resigned and thus made the whole council out of office and the municipality of Mina is under the Governor of Tripoli and the North responsibility until the elections of May 2016.

El Mina does not officially have a representative in the Lebanese Parliament, its people elect with the whole Tripoli district.
Knowing that traditionally each parliamentary bloc of former Prime Minister Rachid Karami who was assassinated in 1986, representing North Lebanon, would have one member from El Mina.

See also
Tripoli, Lebanon

References

"Yawmiyat Madinah" (Diaries of a City) - By J. Touma, Jarousse Press 2003.
"El-Mina - Tarikh w Tourath"  (El Mina: History and Culture) - By A. Kabbara, Dar El-Chamal Press 2006.

External links

Pictures from El Mina
El Mina Tourism Information Center
The Official Website of the Municipality of El-Mina
Abdul Wahab Island in 360

Populated places in the North Governorate
Tripoli District, Lebanon
Eastern Orthodox Christian communities in Lebanon
Sunni Muslim communities in Lebanon
Maronite Christian communities in Lebanon